Secusio ansorgei is a moth in the  subfamily Arctiinae. It was described by Rothschild in 1933. It is found in Angola.

References

Natural History Museum Lepidoptera generic names catalog

Endemic fauna of Angola
Moths described in 1933
Arctiini